A marching machine is a percussion instrument designed to produce the sound of marching feet when played on a wooden or metal surface. It is constructed from a number of short pieces of wooden dowel suspended by string netting within a wooden frame.

References

Idiophones